Football at the 1957 Maccabiah Games was held in several stadiums in Israel starting on 16 September.

The competition was open for men's teams only. Teams from 3 countries participated, United Kingdom, France and Israel. The tournament was won by Israel.

Format
The three teams played each other twice in various venues in Israel, for a total of 4 matches for each team.

Results

References

1957
Maccabiah Games